The Mechanicsville Historic District encompasses a small and cohesive working-class neighborhood west of downtown Danville, Virginia.  The district is bounded by Upper Street on the northwest; North Floyd Street on the northeast; High Street on the southeast; and North Ridge Street on the southwest.  This area was developed beginning roughly in 1880 as a residential district catering to workers in the nearby tobacco-processing facilities.  The houses in the district are in a blend of styles, but are characterized by similar lot sizes and setbacks.  The district includes two churches, and a building that originally served as a tobacco prizery (a building where tobacco leaves are packed into barrels).  The neighborhood was a center of civil rights activism during the 1960s, playing host to Martin Luther King Jr.  It was once somewhat larger; areas to the west and north were razed during urban redevelopment efforts.

The district was listed on the National Register of Historic Places in 2014.

See also
National Register of Historic Places listings in Danville, Virginia

References

Historic districts on the National Register of Historic Places in Virginia
Buildings and structures in Danville, Virginia
National Register of Historic Places in Danville, Virginia